Elisa Hendrik "Beb" Bakhuys (16 April 1909 – 7 July 1982) was a Dutch football player and manager.

Club career
Bakhuys made his senior debut for HBS on 27 September 1925 against Haarlem and scored 36 goals in 44 matches for them. He joined Zwolsche AC and had a spell with THOR in his native Dutch East Indies while working for the Bataafsche Petroleum Maatschappij in Surabaya. He returned to ZAC and later HBS. In 1937 he controversially moved to VVV.

He became the second Dutch player to play outside of the country when he signed as a professional for FC Metz in 1937, in a move which ended his international career. The first Dutch national to play abroad was goalkeeper Gerrit Keizer. Bakhuys was famous for his diving headers. During the Second World War he was forced to work in Leipzig. Throughout his both spells at ZAC, Bakhuys scored 147 goals, in 99 games.

International career
Bakhuys scored 28 goals in 23 games for the Dutch national side. He represented the Netherlands at the 1934 FIFA World Cup,

References

External links

 Profile - FC Metz

1909 births
1982 deaths
People from Pekalongan
Association football forwards
Dutch footballers
Netherlands international footballers
1934 FIFA World Cup players
HBS Craeyenhout players
VVV-Venlo players
FC Metz players
Dutch expatriate footballers
Expatriate footballers in France
Dutch expatriate sportspeople in France
Ligue 1 players
Dutch football managers
FC Metz managers
Dutch expatriate football managers
Expatriate football managers in France
Dutch World War II forced labourers